St John the Evangelist's Church, Oulton, West Yorkshire, England is an active Anglican parish church in the archdeaconry of Leeds and the Diocese of Leeds.

History
The church was built between 1827 and 1829 by Rickman and Hutchinson.  The church was grade II* listed on 5 June 1964.

Architectural style

Exterior
Built between 1827 and 1829 the church is of and Early English style and built of sandstone ashlar with a slate roof.  The church has a west three stage tower with octagonal spire and flying buttresses.  The nave and porch are to the north while the hexagonal vestry is to the South.

Interior
The church has two centred arches with three orders of moulding.  The ceiling is groin-vaulted with carved bosses.  The church organ is on the west end.  There is a wall monument to the church's founder John Blayds who died the year ground broke.

Water damage
In November 2014, a large quantity of lead was stolen from the roof resulting in flooding that caused considerable damage and put the church out of use.  However, funding is being sought to repair the damage.

See also
List of places of worship in the City of Leeds

References

External links

Oulton w Woodlesford: St John the Evangelist, Oulton

Churches in Leeds
Listed buildings in Leeds
Anglican Diocese of Leeds
Church of England church buildings in West Yorkshire
Grade II* listed churches in West Yorkshire
St John the Evangelist's Church